The United States District Court for the Southern District of Iowa (in case citations, S.D. Iowa) has jurisdiction over forty-seven of Iowa's ninety-nine counties. It is subject to the Eighth Circuit Court of Appeals (except for patent claims and claims against the U.S. government under the Tucker Act, which are appealed to the Federal Circuit).

The United States District Court for the District of Iowa, established on March 3, 1845, by 5 Stat. 789, was subdivided into the current Northern and Southern Districts on July 20, 1882, by 22 Stat. 172. Initially, one judge was assigned to each District.

By 1927, a backlog of unresolved cases dating back to 1920 had developed. In October 1927, Judge Martin Joseph Wade announced that he "was through" attempting to try cases requiring more than one day, but urged Congress to create a second judgeship for the Southern District of Iowa. On January 19, 1928, President Calvin Coolidge signed into law a bill that authorized a second judgeship for the District, with the proviso that when the existing judgeship (held by Judge Wade) becomes vacant, it shall not be filled unless authorized by Congress.  When the original judgeship became vacant upon Wade's death in 1931, Congress did not act to reauthorize it, leaving the Southern District with a single judgeship.  A second judgeship in the Southern District was not reauthorized by Congress until 1979, with the creation of the judgeship first held by Harold Duane Vietor.

In 1962, Congress created a new judgeship that would be shared by the Northern and Southern Districts of Iowa.  The shared judgeship was replaced in 1990 when the shared judgeship (then held by Judge Donald Eugene O'Brien) was assigned entirely to the Northern District, and a third Southern District judgeship (first held by Judge Ronald Earl Longstaff) was authorized.

In 2012, Judge Stephanie Marie Rose was the first woman appointed to the bench in the Southern District of Iowa. 

It is headquartered at the United States Courthouse in Des Moines, with satellite facilities in Council Bluffs and at the United States Court House in Davenport.  , the United States Attorney is Richard D. Westphal.

Jurisdiction 

The Southern District of Iowa has three court divisions, each covering the following counties:

The Central Division, covering Adair, Adams, Appanoose, Boone, Clarke, Dallas, Davis, Decatur, Greene, Guthrie, Jasper, Jefferson, Keokuk, Lucas, Madison, Mahaska, Marion, Marshall, Monroe, Polk, Poweshiek, Ringgold, Story, Taylor, Union, Wapello, Warren and Wayne counties.

The Eastern Division, covering Clinton, Des Moines, Henry, Johnson, Lee, Louisa, Muscatine, Scott, Van Buren, and Washington counties.

The Western Division, covering Audubon, Cass, Fremont, Harrison, Mills, Montgomery, Page, Pottawattamie and Shelby counties.

Current judges
:

Former judges

Chief judges

Succession of seats

See also
 Courts of Iowa
 List of current United States district judges
 List of United States federal courthouses in Iowa

References

External links
 Southern District website
 U.S. Attorney for the Southern District

Iowa, Southern District
Iowa law
Des Moines, Iowa
Council Bluffs, Iowa
Davenport, Iowa
1845 establishments in the United States
1882 establishments in Iowa
Courthouses in Iowa
Courts and tribunals established in 1882